Brooklyn Botanic Garden (BBG) is a botanical garden in the borough of Brooklyn, New York City. It was founded in 1910 using land from Mount Prospect Park in central Brooklyn, adjacent to Prospect Park and the Brooklyn Museum. The  garden holds over 14,000 taxa of plants and has nearly a million visitors each year. It includes a number of specialty "gardens within the Garden", plant collections, the Steinhardt Conservatory that houses the C. V. Starr Bonsai Museum, three climate-themed plant pavilions, a white cast-iron-and-glass aquatic plant house, and an art gallery.

History

Site 
The impetus to build Prospect Park stemmed from an April 18, 1859, act of the New York State Legislature that empowered a twelve-member commission to recommend sites for parks in the City of Brooklyn. In February 1860, a group of fifteen commissioners submitted suggestions for park locations in Brooklyn, including a  plot centered on present-day Mount Prospect Park and bounded by Warren Street to the north; Vanderbilt, Ninth, and Tenth Avenues to the west; Third and Ninth Streets to the south; and Washington Avenue to the east. Egbert Viele began drawing plans for the park, which was to straddle Flatbush Avenue and include Prospect Hill and the land now occupied by the Brooklyn Public Library, the Brooklyn Botanic Garden, and the Brooklyn Museum. The onset of the Civil War stopped further activity. Early in 1865, Calvert Vaux was hired to review Viele's plans. Vaux took issue with Flatbush Avenue's division of the park. Vaux's February 1865 proposal excluded parcels of land east of Flatbush Avenue, including Prospect Hill, that were already purchased. The northeast portion served as an ash dump.

Creation 
In 1897, as the city moved toward consolidation, legislation reserved 39 acres (16 ha) for a botanic garden, which was founded in 1910. Initially known as the Institute Park, the garden was run under the auspices of the Brooklyn Institute of Arts and Sciences, which until the 1970s included Brooklyn Museum, Brooklyn Children's Museum, and Brooklyn Academy of Music. The garden opened as the Brooklyn Botanic Garden on May 13, 1911, with the Native Flora Garden as the first established section.

Harold Caparn was appointed as the landscape architect in 1912; over the next three decades he designed most of the remaining grounds, including the Osborne Garden, Cranford Rose Garden, Magnolia Plaza, and Plant Collection. Construction of the Laboratory Building and Conservatory began that year and the building was dedicated in 1917. William M. Kendall designed the building, in the Tuscan Revival style for McKim, Mead & White. Later renamed the Laboratory Administration Building, it was designated a New York City Landmark in 2007.

Later history 
Under BBG president Judith Zuk, who assumed the role in 1990, several of its gardens were renovated, including the Children's, Japanese Hill-and-Pond, Fragrance, Osborne, and Cranford Gardens; the lily pool terrace; and the magnolia plaza, In 1996, the garden began charging admission of $3 per adult after cuts in public and private funding and increases in operating costs. A voluntary donation to enter had, for the past twenty years, failed to return adequate revenue. Community groups protested by presenting a "Poison Ivy Award" for having "given little consideration to the impact this fee would have on ... the immediate neighborhood, which is primarily working class."

In October 2019, the BBG hosted an exhibition called "Fight for Sunlight" to bring more attention to a proposed development adjacent to the Garden at 960 Franklin Avenue, saying that contrary to the developers' statements, its conservatories "would face catastrophic events".

Specialty gardens and collections

Cherry trees

Brooklyn Botanic Garden has more than 200 cherry trees of forty-two Asian species and cultivated varieties, making it one of the foremost cherry-blossom-viewing sites outside Japan. The first cherry trees, a gift from the Japanese government, were planted at the garden after World War I. Each spring, a month-long cherry blossom viewing festival called Hanami is held at the Cherry Esplanade, culminating in a weekend celebration called Sakura Matsuri. The esplanade features two rows of cherry trees with trails and seating areas on the side. Visitors may also sit on the grass between the rows of trees. BBG also has the Cherry Walk in the Japanese Hill-and-Pond Garden and there are also cherry trees in many other locations in the Garden. Depending on weather conditions, the Asian flowering cherries bloom from late March or early April to mid-May. The many species flower at slightly different times and the sequence is tracked on Cherry Watch on the BBG website.

Japanese Hill-and-Pond Garden

BBG's Japanese Hill-and-Pond Garden was one of the first Japanese gardens to be created in an American botanic garden, and reportedly the first one to be accessible free of charge. It was constructed between 1914 and 1915 at a cost of $13,000, a gift of early BBG benefactor and trustee Alfred Tredway White, and it first opened to the public in June 1915. The garden was created by Japanese landscape designer Takeo Shiota (1881–1943).

The garden is a blend of the ancient hill-and-pond style and the more modern stroll-garden styles in which landscape features are gradually revealed along winding paths. Its  contain three hills signifying earth, heaven, and humanity; a waterfall; a pond resembling the Japanese character for "heart"; and an island, all of which were artificially constructed. There are also carefully placed rocks. Among the architectural elements of the garden are wooden bridges, stone lanterns, a viewing pavilion, a torii (gateway), and a Shinto shrine.  The pond is filled with hundreds of Japanese koi fish that visitors can view at the torii or along the garden's trail. There is also a Japanese temple dedicated to Inari, the fox kami. The brook from this garden leads through several other parts of the Brooklyn Botanic Garden, terminating at the Water Garden.

The shrine was destroyed by arson in 1939 and rebuilt in 1950. The viewing pavilion, burned down in 1948, was rebuilt in 1963. The Japanese Garden was renamed the Oriental Garden during World War II and restored in 1950. The Japanese Garden was restored again in 2000 for $3 million; the project was recognized with the New York Landmark Conservancy's 2001 Preservation Award.

Cranford Rose Garden

In 1927, Walter V. Cranford, a construction engineer whose firm built many of Brooklyn's subway tunnels, donated $15,000 to BBG for a rose garden. The Cranford Rose Garden was designed by landscape architect Harold Caparn and Montague Free, the BBG's horticulturist. Many of the original plants were still in the garden in 2019. The rose garden has over 5,000 bushes of nearly 1,400 kinds of roses, including wild species, old garden roses, hybrid tea roses, grandifloras, and polyanthas. The garden also includes a stone statue.

Native Flora Garden

The Native Flora Garden was the first section of the garden to be established and opened in 1911. It was the first of its kind in North America. It was originally a wildflower planting but was redesigned in 1931 as a woodland habitat with plants native to the New York metropolitan area. The Native Flora Garden was closed from 1963 to 1983 due to a lack of funding.

In 2013, the Native Flora Garden was expanded with a new landscape that was designed by Darrel Morrison. The expansion provides new habitats for local plants that would be shaded out by the mature canopy in the original  garden. The expansion has a tallgrass prairie, dry meadow, pine barrens, kettle pond, and a wooden bridge.

Shakespeare Garden

A donation from Henry Clay Folger, founder of the Folger Shakespeare Library in Washington, D.C., led to the construction of BBG's original Shakespeare Garden in 1925; since then it has been moved to another location in the Garden. This English cottage garden has more than 80 plants that are mentioned in William Shakespeare's plays and poems. Plants are labeled with their labels common, Latin and Shakespearean names, relevant quotations, and in some cases a graphic representation of the plant.

Alice Recknagel Ireys Fragrance Garden

Next to the Shakespeare Garden is the Fragrance Garden, which has braille information signs for visitors with impaired vision. It was created in 1955 by landscape architect Alice Recknagel Ireys and was the first garden in the country to be designed for the vision-impaired. Visitors are encouraged to rub the fragrant or pleasingly textured leaves of the plants between their fingers. There are four themed sections in the garden; plants to touch, plants with scented leaves, plants with fragrant flowers, and kitchen herbs. The garden is wheelchair-accessible and all planting beds are at an appropriate height for people in wheelchairs. A fountain provides a calming sound and a place to wash one's hands after touching the plants.

Children's Garden

The BBG Children's Garden is the world's oldest continually operating children's garden within a botanic garden. It was opened in 1914 under the direction of BBG educator Ellen Eddy Shaw and operates as a community garden for children. Hundreds of children register each year for plots on the  site. This Children's Garden is also open for GAP interns, who get an allocated plot in which they can grow vegetables and flowers to harvest later in the year. It also has a compost area that is maintained by the GAP interns and staff. The BBG Children's Garden has served as a model for similar gardens around the world.

Water Garden 
A signature feature in the south garden landscape, the Shelby White and Leon Levy Water Garden is a  wetland and riparian environment with numerous sustainability features. It contains a pond that serves as the terminus of the brook that flows from the Japanese Garden. The Water Garden, which was designed by landscape architecture firm Michael Van Valkenburgh Associates, highlights the beauty of BBG's water elements with a restored and expanded pond-and-brook system and around 20,000 new plants. The Water Garden was completed in 2016; prior to the garden's redesign, the pond was known as Terminal Pond.

Other gardens

A Celebrity Path honors famous Brooklynites such as Barbra Streisand, Woody Allen, and Walt Whitman with a trail of engraved paving stones that lead to the Alfred T. White Amphitheater, which hosts concerts and performances.

The Plant Family Collection, which comprises about a third of BBG's area, includes plants and trees arranged by family to show their evolution. Although recent studies of plant genetics have changed the classification of individual plants, the groupings are a good introduction to the many plant families and their constituent species. The groupings include primitive plants (ferns and conifers) and composite plants.

The Steinhardt Conservatory houses BBG's extensive indoor plant collection in three climate-controlled pavilions for tropical, warm temperate, and desert flora. Also located here is the C.V. Starr Bonsai Museum, one of the oldest collections of the dwarf potted trees in the country; an art gallery; the Robert W. Wilson Aquatic House with its collections of tropical water plants, insect-eating plants, and orchids; and the Stephen K-M. Tim Trail of Evolution, which traces the history of plant evolution and the effects of climate change over 3½ billion years.

BBG also has an Overlook above the Cherry Esplanade that allows visitors a holistic view of the Cherry Esplanade and Garden. The Overlook is also used for bird watching and observing other wildlife in the Garden.

Programs

Education programs

BBG runs diverse programs in youth education, conservation, and community horticulture. The Garden's education department runs a full range of adult and children's classes and events, and also educates thousands of school and camp groups throughout the year.

The Brooklyn Botanic Garden is a founding partner of the Brooklyn Academy of Science and the Environment (BASE), a small public high school dedicated to science, environmental studies, and urban ecology that was launched in 2003. A Field Studies course is offered alongside Living Environment for incoming freshmen where students spend time at BBG developing scientific skills and doing outdoor scientific study. The school is operated by a partnership between BBG, Prospect Park Alliance, and the New York City Department of Education. Students are also connected with scientists and horticulturists who serve as mentors for advanced research studies students develop. BASE graduated its first class in 2007 and has attained its fourth Gates Millennium Scholar in 2013.

BBG's Garden Apprentice Program (GAP) provides internships for students in grades 8 through 12 in gardening, science education, and environmental issues. The program offers students training and volunteer placements with increasing levels of responsibility for up to four years. Many are hired for employment after completing the four-year program.

The Discovery Garden hosts weekly workshops for children. It has interactive exhibits and a small plot with a variety of vegetables. The Garden is currently being expanded.

Project Green Reach is a science-focused school outreach program that annually reaches nearly 2,500 students and teachers in schools in under-served neighborhoods.

Plant science and conservation
Between 1990 and 2010, scientists at Brooklyn Botanic Garden made a comprehensive study of the plants of metropolitan New York City. The study was called the New York Metropolitan Flora project (NYMF); its purpose is to catalog and describe all vascular plants growing in the region.

The BBG Herbarium collection holds over 300,000 specimens of preserved plants, particularly those from the New York metropolitan area. These specimens, some from as early as 1818, aid scientists in tracking species, analyzing the spread of invasive plants, and modeling changes in the metro region's vegetation. There are also holdings from the western United States, the Galapagos Islands, Bolivia, and Mauritius.

The BBG Library, which is housed in the McKim, Mead & White Administration Building, holds a collection of books on horticulture and botany that is available to home gardeners, professionals, and staff. This building houses a Rare Book Room that holds valuable and historic botanical literature and also features classrooms, auditorium, a rotunda, and offices.

Community horticulture

Brooklyn Botanic Garden's Community Greening program (formerly known as Brooklyn GreenBridge) offers residential and commercial gardening programs to block associations, community gardens, community centers, and other groups.

The annual Greenest Block in Brooklyn contest encourages neighborhood beautification by offering classes in planting window boxes, planters, and tree pits, and recognizing outstanding efforts.

The Urban Composting Project supported by the New York City Department of Sanitation offers composting assistance and resources to community gardens and institutions, and information on composting in residential backyards to individuals.

Information

Garden publications

The BBG has been publishing books since 1945, when it launched its popular series of gardening handbooks. Today, the Brooklyn Botanic Garden's Guides to a Greener Planet contain information on garden design, sustainability, and native plants. BBG's website features events, classes, and information on its gardens and collections. It also publishes a Garden News Blog and practical gardening advice. New features are added every week. BBG's collection of historic photographs and lantern slides is also available online.

Visitor information and gardening resources

The BBG has two gift shops, a visitor center, and a Gardener's Resource Center that provides reference services to home gardeners, staff, and the professional horticultural community. Both centers are located in the McKim, Mead and White Administration Building.

A new visitor center at the BBG designed by Weiss/Manfredi was opened on May 16, 2012. It has a Leadership in Energy and Environmental Design (LEED) Gold certification for its sustainable and environmental features: The center has a green roof, geothermal wells, rainwater harvesting and recycled wooden panels in its event space.

, membership of BBG starts at $75 for individuals. Members can attend events in the spring and summer months, including themed sunset picnic nights.

The Palm House, a Beaux Arts-style conservatory, is used as a wedding and events venue catering for up to 300. Group tours are also available. The adjacent Terrace Cafe offers meals and snacks. During the winter, the cafe is relocated indoors to the Steinhardt Conservatory.

The BBG has about 165 full-time and 90 part-time employees, and 600 volunteers. Its annual operating budget is $16.2 million.

Signs and plaques

 The boundary line between the City of Brooklyn and the Township of Flatbush can be found in the park. The brass marker from 1934 describes the spot and reads "This brass line in the walk shows the boundary between the old City of Brooklyn and the Township of Flatbush."
 The Sandstone Boulder plaque reads, "Boulder of sandstone geological age, Triassic. Transported by continental glacier during the ice age from near Paterson NJ."
 The Diabase Boulder plaque reads, "Boulder of Diabase geological age, Triassic. Transported by continental glacier during the ice age from near Haverstraw, NY."
 At the entrance to the park is a sign: "This gate and booth are due to a bequest of Sidney Maddock, 1937"
 In the Japanese garden there is a stone lantern plaque which reads "This Japanese lantern was presented to the city of New York by Mr. Bunj Sakuma a controller of Taito Ward Tokyo, in October 1980, to commemorate the 20th anniversary of the New York-Tokyo sister city affiliation. In 1652, feudal lord Naito Bunzen-no Kami Nobuteru dedicated this 10 foot high, 3 ton, komatsu stone lantern to the Tokugawa shogunate."
 The Liberty Oaks Memorial is a line of oak trees and a 9/11 memorial. The boulder at the start of the line reads, "In Remembrance Of The Events Of September 11, 2001 And To Those Who Lost Their Lives That Day. The Norway Maples That Grew As The First Generation Of Trees On This Site Were Planted In November 1918 To Commemorate The WW1 Armistice."

See also 
 List of botanical gardens in the United States
 List of museums and cultural institutions in New York City

References

External links 

 Brooklyn Botanic Garden website
 Brooklyn Botanic Garden at Google Cultural Institute

1910 establishments in New York City
Art museums and galleries in Brooklyn
Botanical gardens in New York City
Environmental organizations based in New York City
Japanese gardens in the United States
Japanese-American culture in New York City
Museums in Brooklyn
Prospect Park (Brooklyn)